Dušan Anđelković (born 15 June 1982) is a Serbian former professional footballer who played as a defender.

Club career
Anđelković started out at Sloga Kraljevo, before moving to Mladost Lučani. He made his top flight debut with Radnički Beograd in the 2004–05 season. After spending six months at Voždovac, Anđelković was transferred on loan to Red Star Belgrade in January 2006. He eventually signed for the club on a permanent basis, staying there for two more seasons, before moving abroad.

In fall 2008, Anđelković briefly played for Turkish club Kocaelispor. He subsequently moved to Russia and signed for Rostov in January 2009. Two years later, Anđelković joined Russian Premier League newcomers Krasnodar. He left the club at the end of the 2013–14 season.

In the 2015 winter transfer window, Anđelković returned to his former club Red Star Belgrade. He was named in the league's team of the season for 2016–17. In April 2018, Anđelković announced his plans to retire at the end of the season.

International career
Anđelković earned one cap for Serbia, playing the full 90 minutes in a 1–0 UEFA Euro 2008 qualifier win over Kazakhstan on 24 November 2007.

Honours

Club
Red Star Belgrade
 Serbian SuperLiga: 2005–06, 2006–07, 2015–16, 2017–18
 Serbian Cup: 2005–06, 2006–07

Individual
 Serbian SuperLiga Team of the Season: 2016–17

References

External links

 
 
 
 
 

Association football defenders
Expatriate footballers in Russia
Expatriate footballers in Turkey
FC Krasnodar players
FC Rostov players
First League of Serbia and Montenegro players
FK Mladost Lučani players
FK Radnički Beograd players
FK Sloga Kraljevo players
FK Voždovac players
Kocaelispor footballers
Red Star Belgrade footballers
Russian Premier League players
Serbia and Montenegro footballers
Serbia international footballers
Serbian expatriate footballers
Serbian expatriate sportspeople in Russia
Serbian expatriate sportspeople in Turkey
Serbian footballers
Serbian SuperLiga players
Sportspeople from Kraljevo
Süper Lig players
1982 births
Living people